Tumor suppressor candidate 2 is a protein that in humans is encoded by the TUSC2 gene.

This gene is a highly conserved lung cancer candidate gene. No other information about this gene is currently available.

References

Further reading